Philip Booth may refer to:

Philip Booth (bass) (born 1942), American opera singer
Philip Booth (economist) (born 1964), British economist
Philip Booth (poet) (1925–2007), American poet and educator
Phil Booth (basketball) (born 1995), American basketball player
Sir Philip Booth, 2nd Baronet (1907–1960), British aristocrat, and television director and producer in California
Phil Booth, national co-ordinator of the NO2ID campaign against ID cards in the United Kingdom